Perak U21 is a developmental squad of Perak The Bos Gaurus which play in the Malaysian President's Cup.

Perak U19 is a youth squad of Perak The Bos Gaurus which play in the Malaysia Youth League.

Honours

U21 team

President's Cup
 Winners (3): 2006–07, 2012, 2014
 Runners-up (2): 2007–08, 2013

U19 team

Youth League
 Winners (1) : 2007–08
 Runners-up (0):Current squad
U21 team

U19 squad
Perak U19 team, which the club terms the U19, plays in the Malaysia Youth League.

 Youth system 
The club has academy called The Bos Gaurus PAFA Academy or PAFA Academy for short located in Proton City, Tanjung Malim.http://www.thestar.com.my/sport/football/2014/02/21/peraks-firdaus-goes-for-trials-with-aussie-club/ Perak's Firdaus goes for trials with Aussie club The academy players ranged from 7 to 12 years old and came from all over Perak.

PAFA Academy has 14 scouts or coordinators in the Perak region. They all report directly to the general coordinator in Ipoh. PAFA Academy held the Amanjaya Junior Cup tournament that pit all 24 of its junior youth teams to compete.

Moreover, Perak TBG has affiliated clubs around Perak, such as:
 PKNP

Management team
Under new management, the Presidency was taken over by the Menteri Besar of Perak, Dato' Seri Ahmad Faizal Azumu on 1 December 2018.

Administrative staff
 President:  Dato' Seri Ahmad Faizal Azumu Menteri Besar of Perak 
 Deputy President:  Haji Zainal Azman Abu Seman State Secretary of Perak 
 Vice-President 1:  Muhammad Yadzan Mohammad Vice-President 2:  Abdul Aziz Yeop Jamaluddin Vice-President 3:  G. Irudianathan Treasurer:  Adly Shah Ahmad Tah  Executive committee members 1:   Reduan Amir Hamzah Executive committee members 2:   Mahadee Ramlee Executive committee members 3:   Mohd Rizairi Jamaludin Executive committee members 4:   Zainal Anuar Abdul Rashid Executive committee members 5:   Mohd Jamil Zakaria Executive committee members 6:   Abdul Jamil Othman Executive committee members 7:   Johari Baharom Executive committee members 8:   Jurij Jamaludin Executive committee members 9:   Najib Mokhtar'''

Coaching and medical staff

Presidential history

Managerial history

Coaches information
Coaches since 2006:-

Kit suppliers
 Umbro (2001)
 Diadora (2002–2005)
 Joma (2006–2009)
 SPECS (2009–2011)
 Kika (2012–present)

See also
 Perak TBG F.C.

References

External links
 The Bos Gaurus PAFA Academy Official Facebook Page

Youth and Academy
Malaysian reserve football teams
Football academies in Malaysia
1985 establishments in Malaysia